The 2005 Lakeside World Professional Darts Championship was held from 1–9 January 2005 at the Lakeside Country Club in Frimley Green, Surrey.  Raymond van Barneveld lifted the title for a fourth time, defeating England captain Martin Adams 6–2 in the final.  The defending champion Andy Fordham suffered a first round loss to Vincent van der Voort.  The women's event saw Trina Gulliver win her fifth successive title defeating Francis Hoenselaar 2–0 in a repeat the last year's final.

Seeds
Men
  Raymond van Barneveld 
  Ted Hankey 
  Mervyn King 
  Tony West 
  Darryl Fitton 
  Tony O'Shea 
  Martin Adams 
  Vincent van der Voort

Prize money
The prize money was £199,000 for the men's event and £10,000 for the women's event.

Men's Champion: £50,000
Runner-Up: £25,000
Semi-Finalists (2): £11,000
Quarter-Finalists (4): £6,000
Last 16 (8): £4,250
Last 32 (16): £2,750

There was also a shared 9 Dart Checkout prize of £52,000, along with a High Checkout prize of £2,000 per event.

The results

Men

Seeds

Women
  Trina Gulliver
  Francis Hoenselaar
  Crissy Manley
  Jan Robbins

Prize money
The prize money was £10,000 for the women's event.

Women's Champion: £4,000
Runner-Up: £2,000
Semi-Finalists (2): £1,000
Quarter-Finalists (4): £500

The results

Women
Women's bracket:

References

External links
 2005 Lakeside World Championship tournament brochure  World Darts Federation
 Review of the 2005 BDO World Championships

BDO World Darts Championships
BDO World Darts Championship
BDO World Darts Championships
BDO World Darts Championships
Sport in Surrey
Frimley Green